The Peek Baronetcy, of Rousdon in the County of Devon, is a title in the Baronetage of the United Kingdom. It was created on 13 May 1874 for Henry Peek. He was an importer of spices, tea and other groceries, a philanthropist and Conservative Member of Parliament for Surrey Mid. The second Baronet was an astronomer and meteorologist; the third Baronet was high sheriff of Devon in 1912.

Peek baronets, of Rousdon (1874)
Sir Henry William Peek, 1st Baronet (1825–1898)
Sir Cuthbert Edgar Peek, 2nd Baronet (1855–1901)
Sir Wilfrid Peek, 3rd Baronet (1884–1927)
Sir Francis Henry Grenville Peek, 4th Baronet (1915–1996)
Sir William Grenville Peek, 5th Baronet (1919–2004)
Sir Richard Grenville Peek, 6th Baronet (born 1955)

Notes

References
Information on Sir Henry Peek, 1st Baronet

Peek